Internaţional Curtea de Argeș was a Romanian professional football club from Curtea de Argeș, Argeș County, founded in 2000 and dissolved in 2011. During its short existence, the club reached the highest stage in Romanian football, Liga I, playing for a season in this first tier.

History

The club was founded in 2000 by local business man Ion Lazăr, being then named Internațional Piteşti. It activated since the beginning in the Divizia C, and at the end of the first season in history, the club succeeded to promote to the Divizia B, finishing first in the series. The second season in history meant a fifth-place finish at the end of the Divizia B 2001–02 season. Another 3 seasons of second league football followed, finishing 11th, 8th and 13th, respectively, after which they sold their right to play in the Divizia B to Astra Ploiești.

Two years of pause passes for Internațional, until 2007, when Ion Lazăr, founded once again the club, and this time with headquarters in Curtea de Argeș. After buying the right from Voința Macea, the team plays once again in the Third League, and finishes first, promoting to the Liga II.

On 6 June 2009, the club succeeds to promote to the Liga I and obtains the greatest performance ever made by a club from Curtea de Argeș, becoming the third team from Argeș County that will play in the Liga I after FC Argeș Pitești and Dacia Mioveni.

Inter finished 12th its first Liga I season in history, but during the summer it announced that is forfeiting next season because Ion Lazăr, the owner of the club, couldn't afford to keep losing money in the football industry.  Pandurii Târgu Jiu, the club that finished 15th last season, will take its place in the Liga I.

Internațional played in the Liga IV in the 2010–11 season, but was dissolved at the end of the season.

Stadium

Internaţional played its Liga III home matches on the Municipal Stadium in Curtea de Argeș. In the Liga II it played on the Ştrand Stadium in Piteşti and in the Liga I it played on the Dacia Stadium in Mioveni and on the Nicolae Dobrin Stadium in Piteşti.

Honours

Liga II:
Winners (0):
Runners-up (1): 2008–09

Liga III:
Winners (2): 2000–01, 2007–08

Notable managers
Octavian Grigore
Ştefan Stoica
Ionuț Badea
Stelian Badea

References

External links
 Official Site

FC Internațional Curtea de Argeș
Curtea de Argeș
Association football clubs established in 2000
Association football clubs disestablished in 2011
Defunct football clubs in Romania
Football clubs in Argeș County
Liga I clubs
Liga II clubs
Liga III clubs
2000 establishments in Romania
2011 disestablishments in Romania